Axinoptera is a genus of moths in the family Geometridae.

Species
Axinoptera anticostalis Galsworthy, 1999
Axinoptera curviscapulis (Prout, 1958)
Axinoptera fasciata (Warren, 1906)
Axinoptera infusata (Walker, 1866)
Axinoptera melampepla (Prout, 1958)
Axinoptera orphnobathra (Prout, 1958)
Axinoptera penataran Holloway, 1997
Axinoptera plicata (Hampson, 1912)
Axinoptera ruficosta Holloway, 1997
Axinoptera subcostalis Hampson, 1893
Axinoptera turgidata (Walker, 1866)

References

Eupitheciini
Geometridae genera